Simon-Pierre Savard-Tremblay  is a Canadian politician, who was elected to the House of Commons of Canada in the 2019 election. Savard-Tremblay represents the electoral district of Saint-Hyacinthe—Bagot as a member of the Bloc Québécois.

Biography 
Simon-Pierre Savard-Tremblay grew up in Quebec City before settling in Montreal to follow his college studies in economic and social sciences at Collège Stanislas. He holds a bachelor's degree in political science from the Université de Montréal and a master's degree in sociology from the Université du Québec in Montreal. In 2018 he obtained a doctorate in socio-economics of development from the School for Advanced Studies in the Social Sciences in Paris, under the supervision of Jacques Sapir and Florence Weber.

Savard-Tremblay's involvement in politics led him to chair the Forum jeunesse du Bloc Québécois from 2010 to 2012, notably during the 2011 federal election.

He was active as a columnist in the media for several years, contributing to a blog at the Journal de Montréal.

Savard-Tremblay first defended conservative positions. This has gradually moved away to adopt a similar posture of left nationalism and economic nationalism and hostile to neoliberalism. He openly admires the British economist John Maynard Keynes, whom he describes as "the greatest economist of the 20th century" and "the great thinker of society".

In April 2019, Savard-Tremblay launched his campaign for the nomination of the Bloc Québécois in the riding of Saint-Hyacinthe—Bagot. He was elected as Member of Parliament in the federal elections of October 2019.

Electoral Record

References

External links 

 Blog at the Journal de Montréal
 Biographical note on the VLB éditeur website
 Partial list of opinion articles at Le Devoir

1988 births
Bloc Québécois MPs
Living people
Members of the House of Commons of Canada from Quebec
People from Saint-Hyacinthe
Politicians from Quebec City
21st-century Canadian politicians